Andrei Cuculici (sometimes listed as Andrej Cuculici, born December 13, 1983) is a Romanian sprint canoer

Career and medals 
Andrei has competed since 2007. He won a complete set of medals at the ICF Canoe Sprint World Championships with a gold (C-4 1000 m: 2007), a silver (C-2 500 m: 2007), and a bronze (C-4 1000 m: 2009).

Cuculici also finished sixth in the C-2 500 m event at the 2008 Summer Olympics in Beijing.

References
Canoe09.ca profile

1983 births
Canoeists at the 2008 Summer Olympics
Living people
Olympic canoeists of Romania
Romanian male canoeists
ICF Canoe Sprint World Championships medalists in Canadian